Welborn is a surname or personal name, cognate to Welbourne, Wellborn, and the like. People with the name Welborn include:

As a surname
 Amy Welborn (born 1960), American Roman Catholic author, columnist, activist, academic and public speaker
 Bob Welborn (192897), American NASCAR Grand National (now Cup Series) driver
 Ira Clinton Welborn (18741956), American recipient of the Medal of Honor
 Jason Welborn (born 1986), British boxer
 Jeffrey Welborn (active from 2012), U.S. politician in the state of Montana
 Jerry Welborn (born 1932), American sprint canoer who competed in 1972 Summer Olympics
 John Welborn (representative) (18571907), U.S. Representative for Missouri
 John Welborn (born 1970), Australian rugby union player
 Justin Welborn (active from 2001), American actor and singer

As a personal name
 H. Welborn Ayres (190085), judge in the U.S. state of Louisiana
 C. Welborn Daniel (1926-2016) American politician, attorney and judge in the state of Florida
 Welborn G. Dolvin (191691), American soldier
 Welborn Griffith (190144), American soldier
 Welborn C. Wood (187699), American naval officer

See also 
 Caborn-Welborn culture, a prehistoric North American culture
 Welborn Village Archeological Site, an archaeological site of the Caborn-Welborn culture
 F. W. Welborn House, a building in the U.S. state of South Carolina
 John Henry Welborn House, a now-demolished historic home located at Lexington, Davidson County, North Carolina
 USS Welborn C. Wood, a Clemson-class destroyer in the U.S. Navy during World War II
 Wellborn (disambiguation) for that and other alternative spellings of 'Welborn'